The National Day of Reflection in the United Kingdom is a day to remember those who died during the COVID-19 pandemic. It takes place on 23 March, the anniversary of the first lockdown in 2020. It was initiated in 2021 by the Marie Curie charity and is supported by the Church of England.

In 2022 the Poet Laureate, Simon Armitage, wrote the poem "Only Human", which he read at the service held at York Minster on the National Day of Reflection.

References

March observances
Cultural responses to the COVID-19 pandemic
COVID-19 pandemic in the United Kingdom